High Banks, also known as the Helm-Clevenger House, is a historic home and farm located near Stephenson, Frederick County, Virginia. The house was built about 1753, and is a two-story, three bay by two bay, center-hall, double-pile, limestone dwelling. It has a one-story, two-bay by three-bay frame addition and a frame rear wing. The front porch and interior features detailing in the late Greek Revival were added about 1858. Also on the property are a contributing foundation and partial wall of a post-Civil War bank barn and an 18th-century icehouse pit, both made of stone.

It was listed on the National Register of Historic Places in 2011.

See also
 National Register of Historic Places listings in Frederick County, Virginia

References

External links
 

Houses on the National Register of Historic Places in Virginia
Greek Revival houses in Virginia
Houses completed in 1753
Houses in Frederick County, Virginia
National Register of Historic Places in Frederick County, Virginia